Pastwiska may refer to the following places:
Pastwiska, Kuyavian-Pomeranian Voivodeship (north-central Poland)
Pastwiska, Masovian Voivodeship (east-central Poland)
Pastwiska, Subcarpathian Voivodeship (south-east Poland)
Pastwiska, Warmian-Masurian Voivodeship (north Poland)
Pastwiska, Cieszyn (south Poland)